Cyrtodactylus namtiram is a species of gecko that is endemic to India.

References 

Cyrtodactylus
Reptiles described in 2021